The following lists events that happened during 1951 in Libya.

Incumbents
Monarch: Idris (starting December 24)
Prime Minister: Mahmud al-Muntasir (starting March 29)

Events

December
 December 24 - Libya becomes independent from Italy. This also comes with the establishment of Libyan Army.

References

Bibliography
 

 
Years of the 20th century in Libya
Libya
Libya
1950s in Libya